Burdignin is a commune in the Haute-Savoie department in the Auvergne-Rhône-Alpes region in south-eastern France.

Basic 
Burdignin is a common medium mountain located in the heart of the Green Valley, north of the department of Haute Savoie. Burdignin depends on the canton of Boëge and is part of the Chablais Alps but is also close to the Geneva area .

Burdignin has preserved an agricultural and forestry tradition. This quiet little village allows mountain biking (forest track and edges Menoge), but also hiking (snowshoeing in winter the peaks between Mont Blanc and Lake Geneva). The people are bornérandes and bornérands .

Surroundings 
Burdignin is easily accessible by road, just 15 minutes from the motorway ATMB (exit Green Valley)

By Distance 
 3 km from Boege, head of the canton, shops, market on Tuesday morning
 5 km of Habère- Poche, alpine ski area Habère- Poche, Bellevaux Hirmentaz
 7 km of the plateau Moises, Nordic ski and opportunity to make the glider
 12 km from the plateau of Plaine Joux, Nordic ski, hiking peak Miribel
 25 km from Lake Geneva

By Time 
 45 minutes of Annecy
 1 hour from Chamonix
 25 minutes from Thonon-les-Bains
 30 minutes from Geneva

Burdignin in numbers 

Total Population: 643 inhabitants (2008)
Area: 980 hectares
Elevation Capital: 850 meters
Maximum elevation: 1297 meters

See also
Communes of the Haute-Savoie department

References
Burdugnin Info

Communes of Haute-Savoie